Universidade Livre de Música (ULM) (English: Free University of Music) is a music school linked to Centro Tom Jobim, located in Sao Paulo. It offers regular courses and free courses, and concerts, workshops and masterclasses with locations in the neighborhoods of Brooklin and Luz. It is a free school and aims at training professionals in the music business. The coexistence of musical scholars and professionals bodied integrated to Centro Tom Jobim provides students with a differentiated experience, preparing for its entrance into artistic life.

History 
The university was established in 1989 by Tom Jobim. First president and dean was Antonio Carlos Jobim. After 2001, the university received a name: the Tom Jobim School of Music – EMESP Tom Jobim.

References

External links
 Official Website (In Portuguese)

Universities and colleges in São Paulo (state)
Educational institutions established in 1989
Music schools in Brazil
1989 establishments in Brazil
Universities and colleges in São Paulo